Roberto Lindeborg (born 9 May 1942) is a Dutch Antillean weightlifter. He competed in the men's bantamweight event at the 1972 Summer Olympics.

References

1942 births
Living people
Dutch Antillean male weightlifters
Olympic weightlifters of the Netherlands Antilles
Weightlifters at the 1972 Summer Olympics
Place of birth missing (living people)
Weightlifters at the 1971 Pan American Games
Pan American Games medalists in weightlifting
Pan American Games gold medalists for the Netherlands Antilles
Pan American Games silver medalists for the Netherlands Antilles
Pan American Games bronze medalists for the Netherlands Antilles
Medalists at the 1971 Pan American Games